Harriet Windsor-Clive, Baroness Windsor (30 July 1797 – 9 November 1869) was a landowner and wealthy benefactor in the Penarth and Cardiff area of South Wales. She is probably best known for developing Penarth Dock in competition with the Marquess of Bute's docks in Cardiff and for her charitable donations in the area. A daughter of the 5th Earl of Plymouth, she was granted the title 13th Baroness Windsor in 1855 after the deaths of her sister and brother.

Background
Harriet Windsor was born on 30 July 1797 in London the third child and second daughter of Other Hickman Windsor, the Earl of Plymouth. In 1819 she married Robert Henry Clive, a Member of Parliament for Ludlow, Shropshire. Clive died in 1854 and, in 1855 (after the death of her elder sister) Harriet Clive was granted the title 13th Baroness Windsor, after the title had been held in abeyance since 1833. She legally changed her name to Harriet Windsor-Clive in November 1855.

After the sudden death of their brother the 6th Earl of Plymouth in 1833, Harriet and her sister Maria had become co-heiresses of their father's estate, known as the Plymouth Estate. It covered the land in Glamorgan on which the town of Penarth and the Cardiff suburb of Grangetown are now built. It also included St Fagans Castle, the family's seat in the area. With Harriet being the favourite sister, the bulk of the Plymouth Estate was left to her, including Hewell Grange in Worcestershire and St Fagans Castle. Previously living in Essex, Harriet moved to Cardiff while the St Fagans property was restored. When the restoration was complete, they lived at Hewell Grange but visited St Fagans frequently.

Business interests

Penarth Dock
In 1855 Baroness Windsor formed the Penarth Harbour Company to develop a dock for Penarth on her land. She intended to compete with the new Cardiff Docks which were being developed by the 2nd and 3rd Marquess of Bute. The docks, curving between Penarth Head and the River Ely, were completed by 1865. Baroness Windsor was due to perform the opening ceremony on 10 June 1865, but failed to turn up in time to meet the high tide. The chairman of the Taff Vale Railway (who were lessees of the dock) made the baroness's excuses and performed the ceremony. Baroness Windsor petitioned (unsuccessfully) against the Bute Dock bills, but the Penarth Docks were a success all the same exporting 900,000 tons of coal a year by 1870.

Grangetown
In 1857 the Baroness obtained an Act to enable her to develop her lands on the Cardiff side of the River Ely. The new housing development was to be called The Grange, and is now known as Grangetown. One of the earliest pubs, operating from the 1860s until 2008 on Penarth Road, was called The Baroness Windsor.

Philanthropy
On her death, Baroness Windsor was praised her as "simple and unostentatious in her manner" and generous towards charitable causes, The Cardiff and Merthyr Guardian saying "In every movement which tended to the well-being of those around her, her large subscriptions expressed her sympathy with them".

She paid for the construction of the Church of St Fagan, Trecynon near Aberdare (1852–53) then, when it burnt down in 1856, paid for its construction a second time. She contributed towards the restoration of a number of churches in the Cardiff area, including St Mary’s Church at St Fagans, Radyr's St John the Baptist and the Cathedral at Llandaff. The national schools at Aberdare and Penarth were also financed from her purse. Shortly before her death she financed the building of St Philip's Church in Webheath, Redditch, including the three-lighted stained glass above the altar, however she died before its consecration in February 1870.

Death
Harriett Windsor-Clive died in St Leonards-on-Sea, Sussex, on 9 November 1869, having been ill for a few months. With her eldest son having died earlier the same year, her estate was passed to her infant grandson, Robert Windsor-Clive who became The Baron Windsor and later the 1st Earl of Plymouth when the title was revived in 1905.

She was buried on 16 November at the church of Bromfield, Shropshire, in a vault with her late husband and son. Shops were closed for part of the day in Bromsgrove, Ludlow and Redditch.

References

Sources
 
 

1797 births
1869 deaths
Penarth
Grangetown, Cardiff
Spouses of British politicians
Burials in Shropshire
English baronesses
19th-century British philanthropists